Earl Albert "Shag" Hawkins (September 23, 1920 – March 10, 2005) was an American professional basketball player. He played in the National Basketball League in two games for the Tri-Cities Blackhawks during the 1948–49 season.

References

1920 births
2005 deaths
American men's basketball players
Auburn Tigers men's basketball players
Basketball players from Birmingham, Alabama
Forwards (basketball)
People from Walker County, Alabama
Tri-Cities Blackhawks players
Wilkes-Barre Barons players